Sergio Mayer Breton Izturiz Pinilla, (born May 21, 1966 in Mexico City) is a Mexican actor, singer, producer, and politician. He is serving as a federal deputy to the LXIV Legislature of the Mexican Congress.

Biography

Sergio started his career in 1982 in a group called Chévere Internacional, which he belonged to for 4 years. With the group, he toured all over Latin America and the United States. Once the tour ended, he returned to Mexico to complete his Business Administration degree at the Universidad Iberoamericana.

During that time he made commercials and fashion runways. He was invited to participate in the Heraldo awards as a dancer.

Luis de Llano liked what he saw and invited him to participate in the Garibaldi group project.

With the same producer, he worked in the shows Papá Soltero and La Edad de Oro, plus various appearances as a conductor.

He takes acting classes with Sergio Jiménez and Rita Macedo. In 1996 he played in the soap opera Confidente de Secundaria. In TV Azteca he was the artistic director and producer of many programs, plus being the creator of CEFAC.

Later he created the concept of Solo Para Mujeres with Alexis Ayala. He combined his singing and acting activities with his business and artistic representation with Espectaculos Mayer. Solo Para Mujeres "Only for Women" is a male strip show where many male models, including him, take off their clothes in public and show nothing but a thong.  He has made videos of these performances, one of which has been out on DVD in 2009.

In May 2004 he decided to take part in the second chapter of Big Brother VIP in its third edition; in which he ended in second place, beaten only by Roxana Castellanos. He has a son with actress Bárbara Mori, Sergio Jr.

In March 2007, he appeared in the music video for Ivy Queen's hit single "Que Lloren".

Election as federal deputy

In 2018, Mayer ran as the Juntos Haremos Historia candidate for federal deputy from Mexico City's sixth federal electoral district, winning with more than 40 percent of the vote.

Filmography

References

External links
 Official Website
 

1966 births
Mexican male telenovela actors
Mexican male television actors
Mexican television producers
Male actors from Mexico City
Mexican people of English descent
Living people
Deputies of the LXIV Legislature of Mexico
Mexican actor-politicians
Members of the Chamber of Deputies (Mexico) for Mexico City